Orava is the traditional name of a region situated in northern Slovakia (as ) and partially also in southern Poland (as ). The northern part of is one of the regions which are part of the Goral Lands.

Etymology
The name arises from the Orava river (a major river flowing through the region).

History
The county arose before the 15th century. The county's territory was situated along the Orava River between Zázrivá and the Tatra Mountains. Its area amounted to  around 1910. The original seat of the county was Orava Castle.

Geography
Orava is now recognized as one of Slovakia's 25 tourist regions, however, it is not an administrative region unlike its predecessor. In Slovakia, Orava is divided between Dolný Kubín, Tvrdošín, and Námestovo districts in the Žilina Region. The village of Oravská Polhora is the northernmost settlement of Slovakia. The most important town on the Slovak side (and also the seat of the former county) is Dolný Kubín. The Polish part of Orava belongs to the Lesser Poland Voivodeship, to the Nowy Targ County, with the main village of the Polish side being Jabłonka.

References

External links
 Official regional website 
 Orava region at Slovakia.travel
 Spectacular Slovakia – Orava

Traditional regions of Slovakia
Regions of Poland